The Northern Hospital in Epping, Melbourne, Australia, is  major community hospital.  It lies in the north of Melbourne, next to Pacific Epping.

It is a 400-bed hospital serving the northern suburbs of Melbourne, as well as the surrounding country areas of Victoria. The Northern Health catchment includes three of the state's six growth areas: Hume, Whittlesea and Mitchell, and the northern growth corridor population is projected to grow by 58 per cent between 2016 and 2031. It has the busiest emergency departments in the state, treating approximately 100,000 patients each year.

The nursing wards are called Units with the following names: Children Unit, Coronary Care, Intensive Care, Maternity and Women's Health, Medical, Surgical, Psychiatry, Short Stay Unit, cardiovascular laboratory and Special Care Nursery.

The Northern Hospital is one of the clinical schools of the Melbourne Medical School.

References

External links
 
 The Northern Hospital
 Services at Northern Health

Hospitals in Melbourne
1998 establishments in Australia
Buildings and structures in the City of Whittlesea
Hospitals established in 1998
Hospital buildings completed in 1998